Lawford is a village in Essex, England.  

Lawford may also refer to:

Places
 Lawford, Somerset, England, a village
 Lawford, Virginia, United States, an unincorporated community
 Lawford, West Virginia, United States, an unincorporated community
 Lawford Islands, Nunavut, Canada
 Church Lawford, Warwickshire, England
 Little Lawford, Warwickshire, England
 Long Lawford, Warwickshire, England

People
 Barbara Ann Lawford (born 1942), American model and Playboy Playmate of the Month for February 1961
 Betty Lawford (1912–1960), English actress
 Christopher Lawford (1955-2018), American author, actor and activist, son of Peter Lawford
 David Christopher Lawford (born 1987), grandson of Peter Lawford
 Dean Lawford (born 1977), English former rugby league footballer
 Herbert Lawford (1851–1925), Scottish tennis player
 John Lawford (c. 1756–1842), Royal Navy admiral
 Ningali Lawford (born 1967), Australian actress
 Patricia Kennedy Lawford (1924–2006), American socialite, sister of John F., Robert, and Ted Kennedy
 Peter Lawford (1923–1984), English-born American actor
 Robin Elizabeth Lawford (born 1961), American environmentalists and marine biologists
 Sydney Turing Barlow Lawford (1865–1953), British Army lieutenant-general, father of Peter Lawford
 Trent Lawford (born 1988), Australian cricketer
 Victoria Francis Lawford (born 1958), daughter of Peter Lawford
 Lawford Davidson (1890–1964), British film actor

Other uses
 HMS Lawford, two ships of the Royal Navy
 William Lawford, a fictional character in Bernard Cornwell's Sharpe novel series
 Lawford, New Hampshire, a fictional town depicted in the 1989 novel Affliction by Russell Banks